These are the official results of the Men's 20 km Walk event at the 1991 World Championships in Tokyo, Japan. There were a total number of 37 participating athletes, with the final held on Saturday August 24, 1991, with the start at 08:30h local time.

Medalists

Abbreviations
All times shown are in hours:minutes:seconds

Records

Intermediates

Final

See also
 1990 Men's European Championships 20km Walk (Split)
 1991 Race Walking Year Ranking
 1992 Men's Olympic 20km Walk (Barcelona)
 1993 Men's World Championships 20km Walk (Stuttgart)

References
 Results
 IAAF
 Die Leichtathletik-Statistik-Seite

W
Racewalking at the World Athletics Championships